Turrell is a city in Crittenden County, Arkansas, United States. Per the 2020 census, the population was 517.

Geography
Turrell is located in northern Crittenden County at  (35.376351, -90.264583). It is bordered by the town of Gilmore to the north. Turrell is located on Arkansas Highway 77, just southeast of the junction where Interstate 55 and U.S. Routes 61 merge. Prior to 2021, US 63 merged here too. Interstate 55 leads south  to Memphis, Tennessee, and north  to Blytheville, Arkansas, near the Missouri border. US 61/Interstate 555 leads northwest  to Jonesboro.

The Burlington Northern-Santa Fe Railroad runs through Turrell. Two major lines of the Burlington Northern-Santa Fe Springfield Division converge at Turrell (the Thayer South and the River subdivisions), which funnel trains from the Springfield, Missouri, yard and the St. Louis yard, respectively, to Turrell. Once these two lines converge, the trackage then goes to Memphis. The railroad was formerly the St. Louis–San Francisco Railway (better known as the Frisco). The Frisco Railroad was absorbed by the Burlington Northern in 1980.

Demographics

2020 census

Note: the US Census treats Hispanic/Latino as an ethnic category. This table excludes Latinos from the racial categories and assigns them to a separate category. Hispanics/Latinos can be of any race.

2000 Census
As of the census of 2000, there were 957 people, 326 households, and 222 families residing in the town. The racial makeup of the city was 19.44% White, 78.79% Black or African American, 0.10% Native American, 0.94% from other races, and 0.73% from two or more races.  2.93% of the population were Hispanic or Latino of any race.

There were 326 households, out of which 30.7% had children under the age of 18 living with them, 32.5% were married couples living together, 29.1% had a female householder with no husband present, and 31.9% were non-families. 27.6% of all households were made up of individuals, and 11.7% had someone living alone who was 65 years of age or older.  The average household size was 2.94 and the average family size was 3.70.

In the town, the population was spread out, with 34.1% under the age of 18, 8.7% from 18 to 24, 23.6% from 25 to 44, 21.4% from 45 to 64, and 12.2% who were 65 years of age or older.  The median age was 33 years. For every 100 females, there were 90.6 males.  For every 100 females age 18 and over, there were 79.3 males.

The median income for a household in the town was $15,000, and the median income for a family was $21,750. Males had a median income of $26,250 versus $14,861 for females. The per capita income for the town was $8,908.  About 38.1% of families and 41.0% of the population were below the poverty line, including 50.8% of those under age 18 and 30.4% of those age 65 or over.

Education 
Public education for early childhood, elementary and secondary school students is primarily provided by the Marion School District, which leads to graduation from Marion High School.

On July 1, 2010, the former Turrell School District consolidated with the Marion School District, thus closing the former Turrell High School. The Turrell High School mascot was the Rockets and its boys basketball teams won two consecutive Class A state basketball championships in 1999 and 2000 and the girls won the state title in 1987.

Notable person
Jerry Rook (born 1943), two-time All-American basketball player at Arkansas State; born in Turrell

References

External links

Cities in Crittenden County, Arkansas
Cities in Arkansas
Memphis metropolitan area